Sydney University Australian National Football Club (SUANFC) was founded in 1865 and is the oldest Australian rules football club in New South Wales. This claim is based on the club being a spin-off from Sydney University Football Club, Australia's oldest rugby union club, which experimented with Australian rules in its early years. SUANFC did not play its first official game until 1887.

Sydney University currently fields seven teams: NEAFL (Seniors), Premier (Reserves), Division 1 (Blues), Division 2 (Reds), Division 4 (Golds), Division 5 (Platinums) and Under 19 Premier Division (Colts).

History
The Students have participated in Sydney football's elite competition for a total of 37 seasons (as at the end of 2019) in four separate stints. In the 10 seasons from 1948 to 1957, the side managed four "wooden spoons" and two second last finishes, with seventh place out of 10 clubs in 1954 .

The next stint in the top flight was between 1962 and 1968, and then reserve grade only in 1969-70.  Then there was involvement in the Sydney District Football Association (the word "District" was later dropped from the title) between 1971 and 1987. In the competition's inaugural season, the side contested an "all student" grand final against the University of New South Wales, but despite managing the same number of scoring shots as the opposition, they went under by 25 points. Another grand final appearance against the same adversaries in 1977 brought a similar result.

Sydney University's first SFA premiership arrived in 1981 after a 10.14 (74) to 9.12 (68) grand final defeat of St Ives, but the following year brought disappointment with a 42-point defeat at the hands of the same opponents.

After consecutive flags in 1986 (a 16-point defeat of Manly-Warringah) and 1987 (by 62 points over Bankstown Sports) the side was ready for a 3rd stint at the SFL. After a wooden spoon in 1988, the students began to make steady progress.

By 1992, under the expert guidance of former Sydney Swans stalwart Rod Carter, the Students were ready to take a serious tilt at the flag, and after finishing as minor premiers they qualified to meet reigning premiers North Shore in the premiership decider and won by 65 points. Final scores were Sydney University 18.16 (124) to North Shore 8.11 (59. After dropping to 5th in 1993, the side moved to 8th position (out of 10) in 1994, before returning to the SFA. After taking a couple of season to find their feet, the Students contested every grand final bar one between 1997 and 2001, although they were only ultimately able to secure 2 premierships.

In 2007, the Students were re-admitted to the top flight of the Sydney AFL after an absence of 12 years. Under coach Daniel Archer, the club finished with a respectable five wins to finish in eighth spot on the ladder. The club was to take bigger strides in 2008, just missing out on a finals berth on the last day of the season after a loss to North Shore.

The 2009 season saw a change of coach – Roger Moten who had coached local rival UTS to premiership success was installed, as was a new captain in Mark Egan. Again, the Students fell agonisingly short of a finals berth after a string of close losses throughout the season, however there was success at an individual level for two players with Tom Young winning the Sydney AFL Rising Star award and Brydon Coles taking home the coveted Phelan Medal for the Best & Fairest player in the Sydney AFL Premier Division.

In 2010 the Students showed they belonged amongst the elite clubs in the Sydney AFL, taking out the minor premiership following a 14-game winning streak to end the home and away rounds. The club qualified for its maiden Sydney AFL Premier Division Grand Final since re-entry into the top flight with a hard-fought win against Western Suburbs. The club was experiencing its best season of the modern era, with its Division 1 and Colts sides also qualifying for the Grand Final, along with multiple individual award winners at the annual Sydney AFL awards night. Alex Lee took out the Phelan Medal, finishing 2nd in the vote tally but winning on default due to Damien Bowles from East Coast Eagles who accumulated more votes but was ruled ineligible due to a suspension through the year. This marked the first time in history an SUANFC player claimed the award two years in a row, whilst Tim Air collected the Snow Medal (awarded to Best and Fairest in Division 1) and Monty Krochmal was awarded the Kealy Medal (for U18 Premier Division B&F). Roger Moten was named Sydney AFL Coach of the Year for his achievements. The Students were defeated on Grand Final day in both Premier Division and Division 1 by East Coast and UTS respectively, however the Colts were able to hoist the trophy in the Under 18s with a thrilling victory over their East Coast counterparts.

2011 saw Uni consolidate on their performances of the previous year, with the Senior team falling one game short of qualifying for a second consecutive Grand Final. However, the season was a success across all grades with all six teams at the club qualifying for finals action. The best performed side were the Division 3 'Reds' who were valiant in a Grand Final defeat at the hands of UNSW. Another highlight for the year was former Uni star Tom Young being selected to make his debut for Collingwood, thereby becoming the first Sydney University player to reach the AFL. In August, SUANFC accepted an invitation to the NEAFL which will see the proud club being pitted against opponents from NSW, Queensland, ACT and the Northern Territory from 2012 onward.

2012 was a year of mixed results for the Students, with the elevation of the Seniors to the North East Australian Football League (NEAFL). The elevation of the Seniors to the NEAFL also saw the club's Reserves side elevated to the Sydney AFL Premier Division, however the 3rd to 5th grade sides remained in their existing divisions (3rd Grade – Div 2, 4th Grade – Div 3, 5th Grade – Div 5). While the Seniors and Reserves struggled to post many wins for the year, the club did taste success in the lower grades with all three lower grade sides playing finals. The most successful of these sides was the Division 5 'Golds' who triumphed over arch-rivals UTS by 5 points in a thrilling Grand Final at Blacktown International Sportspark to deliver the club its only premiership for 2012.

2013 was a year that saw two divisional changes, including the 5th grade 'Golds' being elevated to Division 4 and the birth of a new division 5 side (6th Grade 'Platinums'). The 3rd Grade – Div 2 'blues' enjoyed winning a premiership over Manly. While the 5th Grade – Div 4 'Golds' were unlucky to lose the final to Pennant Hills. The 4th Grade – Div 3 'Reds', Under 18's and first year 6th Grade – Div 5 'Platinums' all managed to make finals.

League affiliations
Affiliated: NSWANFL 1948–57 & 1962–68; SFA 1971–87; SFL 1988–94; SFA 1995–2006; SFL 2007–present

Premierships: SFL – 1992 (1 total); SFA – 1981, 1986–87, 1997, 2003, 2005 (6 total)

Phelan Medallists: Geoff Davidson 1953; Michael Davis 1990; Brydon Coles 2009; Alex Lee 2010 (4 total)

Snow Medallists: Peter Sadler 1971; Peter Moggach 1979; Tim Driscoll 1987; Tim Air 2010 (4 total)

NEAFL MVP: Tom Young 2015 (1 total)

See also
Sydney AFL
Melbourne University Football Club
Adelaide University Football Club
University of Queensland Australian Football Club

References

External links

 

Australian rules football clubs established in 1863
University Australian rules football clubs
Aus
Australian rules football clubs in Sydney
1863 establishments in Australia